David (Dave) Lawrence is a Canadian actor, improviser, and producer. He most recently played Terry on the Trailer Park Boys: Jail series, during its first season. He is best known for his role as the writer, creator and star of the FUBAR franchise.

Background 
Dave Lawrence was born and raised in Calgary, Alberta and attended Saint Mary's High School. He joined the Loose Moose Theatre Company when he was 15 years old and is currently a senior ensemble performer and instructor with the theatre. He studied at Mount Royal College (now Mount Royal University) and travelled to Japan and Australia to perform as a busker and puppeteer.

Career 
In 2000, Lawrence, with Michael Dowse and Paul Spence, created the mockumentary film FUBAR, which was produced on Lawrence's credit card with a $10,000 shooting budget and the film was an official entry into the 2002 Sundance Film Festival.

Lawrence's character, Terry Cahill, was created and conceptualized before the film, in the mid-nineties at the Loose Moose Theatre. Lawrence approached Michael Dowse on the set of his first film Static with an idea to create an improvised Mockumentary film based on the character.

Along with a team, Lawrence wrote, produced and created the FUBAR film, playing Terry, a central character of the FUBAR franchise. Lawrence continues to play in the role of Terry today. The film was shot in and around Calgary, Alberta, and the entirety of the film dialogue was improvised, with only the outline of the scene predetermined.  

In 2004, Lawrence won a Bessie Craft Award for his work with the Nova Scotia government in an anti-smoking campaign. 

In 2007, Lawrence starred opposite Leslie Nielsen in the Discovery Channel series Doctor*Ology.

In 2010 the sequel to FUBAR, FUBAR 2: Balls to the Wall, made its world premiere by opening the Midnight Madness program at the Toronto International Film Festival and premiered at the South by Southwest. This film was a runner-up for the People's Choice Award.

In 2011 Lawrence was named one of Calgary's Top 40 under 40 by Avenue Magazine in 2011.

Lawrence is the co-creator of the television series FUBAR: Age of Computer which aired on City TV and Viceland in 2017. Lawrence recently played Terry on the Trailer Park Boys: Jail which is aired through the streaming site Swearnet.

Filmography

References

External links 
 

Living people
1976 births
Canadian male film actors
Canadian male television actors
Male actors from Calgary